Dakota, Nebraska may refer to:

Dakota City, Nebraska
Dakota County, Nebraska